Jack Sendak (July 20, 1923 – February 3, 1995) was a children's literature author.  He was the brother of Maurice Sendak and the son of Philip Sendak. 

Sendak served in the U.S. Army during the Second World War, and later worked for Emerson Radio and Television. He credited his father with inspiring his storytelling talent through his regular bedtime folk tales. Two of his books, Circus Girl (1957) and The Happy Rain (1956), were illustrated by Maurice. Two other books were illustrated by Mitchell Miller Jr. (b.1947), son of popular conductor Mitch Miller, whom Maurice Sendak described as "one of the most gifted of the new generation of illustrators." His 1971 book The Magic Tears, illustrated by Miller, won the Children's Book Showcase award. Sendak died on February 3, 1995, at the age of 71, in New Jersey, and was survived by his wife.

Selected bibliography
 The Happy Rain (1956) (illustrated by Maurice Sendak)
 Circus Girl (1957) (illustrated by Maurice Sendak)
 The Second Witch (1965) (illustrations by Uri Shulevitz)
 The King of the Hernits and Other Stories (1966) (illustrated by Margot Zemach)
 Martze (1968) (illustrated by Mitchell Miller) 
 The Magic Tears (1971) (illustrated by Mitchell Miller)

References

External links
Jack Sendak page at HarperCollins

American children's writers
1923 births
1995 deaths
Maurice Sendak
United States Army soldiers
United States Army personnel of World War II